Gerson Gnoatto (born 8 October 1963) is a Brazilian gymnast. He competed in seven events at the 1984 Summer Olympics.

References

External links
 

1963 births
Living people
Brazilian male artistic gymnasts
Olympic gymnasts of Brazil
Gymnasts at the 1984 Summer Olympics
Sportspeople from Porto Alegre
Gymnasts at the 1987 Pan American Games
Pan American Games bronze medalists for Brazil
Pan American Games medalists in gymnastics
Medalists at the 1987 Pan American Games